Qardho Airport , also known as Gardo Airport, is an airport serving Qardho, a town in the northeastern Bari region of Somalia.

Overview

In late September 2013, Puntland Deputy Minister of Civil Aviation Abdiqani Gelle announced that the authorities in Somalia's autonomous Puntland region would carry out major renovations at the Qardho Airport, as well as at the Garowe International Airport in Garowe and the Abdullahi Yusuf International Airport in Galkayo. A tender process for a similar upgrade initiative was concurrently launched at the Bender Qassim International Airport in Bosaso.

See also
List of airports in Somalia

Notes

External links

Airports in Somalia
Puntland